Edgars Roberts Krūmiņš (21 August 1909 – unknown) was a Latvian chess player.

Biography
In 1926, Edgars Krūmiņš graduated from the Second City Gymnasium in Riga. In 1929, he entered the Faculty of Mathematics in University of Latvia, which he graduated in 1935. In the academic year 1936/37, Edgars Krūmiņš was a mathematics teacher at a secondary school in the Latvian city Cesvaine.

In the early 1930s, Edgars Krūmiņš became one of the strongest chess players in Latvia. The his biggest success - 3rd place in Latvian Chess Championship in 1934 (after the winners Fricis Apšenieks and Vladimirs Petrovs). For this success Krumins was awarded the title of Latvian National Chess Master. He was the fifth chess player after Hermanis Matisons, Fricis Apšenieks, Vladimirs Petrovs and Movsas Feigins, who received this honorary title.

Edgars Krūmiņš played for Latvia in the Chess Olympiad:
 In 1935, at fourth board in the 6th Chess Olympiad in Warsaw (+3, =5, -2).

Edgars Krūmiņš played for Latvia in the unofficial Chess Olympiad:
 In 1936, at fourth board in the 3rd unofficial Chess Olympiad in Munich (+5, =6, -5).

Many chess publications (including the Internet portals Olimpbase.org, Chessgames.com) incorrectly indicate that it was not Edgar who participated in Chess Olympiads, but his brother Alfrēds Krūmiņš (1911-1980), who was also a chess player.

In the late 1930s, Edgars Krūmiņš fell ill and moved away from an active chess life. The last known tournament with his participation was the 1940 Riga Chess Championship, in which he shared 11th - 12th place. There is no reliable information about his future fate.

References

External links

Edgars Krūmiņš chess games at 365chess.com

1909 births
Year of death missing
Sportspeople from Riga
Latvian chess players
Chess Olympiad competitors
University of Latvia alumni